Ken Hutchins (born 20th century) is an American inventor who defined and popularized the Super Slow form of resistance training exercise, and developed methodology, trainer certifications, and exercise equipment to specifically support the techniques.

Career and activities
Hutchins was introduced in 1966, to strength training by a family friend who explained the importance of physical strength to musicianship and built Hutchins his first weight bench. Later, in 1968, this friend introduced Hutchins to Ellington Darden, and through Darden in 1971, Hutchins learned of Arthur Jones and Nautilus, Inc. strength-training principles. Hutchins's serious contributions to the field of exercise, began in 1975 when he served Darden as a proofreader and writer.

In 1977, Hutchins was employed at Nautilus as a surgery technician, writer, surgical photographer, and proofreader. From 1979 to 1982, he served as inside salesperson and traveling speaker, addressing scores of Nautilus clinics yearly.

In 1982, Hutchins and his wife, Brenda, were sent by Arthur Jones to Gainesville, Florida, to supervise the exercise program for the Nautilus-sponsored osteoporosis study at the University of Florida Medical School. During this year, Hutchins wrote the SuperSlow Protocol article. He refined its application with over 8,000 one-on-one workouts between 1982 and 1986.

In 1986, Hutchins worked as an exercise equipment designer and prototype developer, specializing in the application of coupled movement arms. In 1987, he compiled historical developments of Nautilus equipment and wrote video scripts for detailed Nautilus education.

After leaving Nautilus, Hutchins established his own exercise practice, continuing to develop the Super Slow techniques and eventually publishing several editions of a technical manual for the application of Super Slow exercise.

In the early 1990s, a certification program was developed for exercise professionals to bring standardization to SuperSlow training. Hutchins developed an interest group, calling it the Super Slow Exercise Guild (Inc.), which met to refine techniques and published articles in its newsletter, The Exercise Standard, from 1994 to 2000. Numerous similar methods have been spun off by members of the guild and others as their ideas or business models developed.

The New York Times Magazine included Super Slow and Hutchins in the 2001 edition of its annual Year in Ideas series.

In 2009, Hutchins and his wife joined Renaissance Exercise, continuing to produce evolutionary designs for exercise equipment. Expanded exercise technique and protocol descriptions were published in 2011.

Contributions
Hutchins's  major accomplishments during the Nautilus Osteoporosis Project were:
 Composing the Exercise vs. Recreation Philosophy.
 Discovering the principle of the variable counterbalance applied to counterbalance human bodytorque.
 Identifying friction as a major issue in exercise equipment and motor control.
 Identifying four major considerations for the first comprehensive definition of exercise.
 Evolving photographic standardization for comparing the results of exercise and diet programs.
 Discovering that all human muscular functions are negative-cam effects.
 Identifying the conflict between assumed and real objective as a major psychological challenge in exercise.

In the early 1990s, Hutchins and his wife developed and patented the Linear Spine Machines for his company, SuperSlow Systems, Inc. This equipment was designed to provide crucial exercise for severely debilitated back and abdominal musculatures.

See also

References

Year of birth missing (living people)
Place of birth missing (living people)
20th-century births
20th-century American non-fiction writers
21st-century American non-fiction writers
American inventors
American sportswriters
Living people
People from Texas
Sports inventors and innovators
20th-century American male writers
American male non-fiction writers
21st-century American male writers
People in the strength training industry